There are numerous Bermingham monuments in Ireland particularly in counties Kildare, Offaly, Galway, and Dublin. Most are now in a poor state. Athenry Castle in Galway has been restored,  using building techniques similar to those employed when it was originally built.

There are a total of five castles and one monastery still in existence in counties Kildare and Offaly. Carbury Castle, Grange Castle and Carrick Castles are in County Kildare, while Blundell Castle, Kinnefad Castle, and Monasterois Monastery are in County Offaly. In Galway there is Athenry Castle and Monastery, Dunmore Castle and Bermingham House, the seat of the last Baron of Athenry and Earl of Louth, Thomas Bermingham until his death in 1799.

Carbury Castle, County Kildare 

Carbury Castle is situated in the townland of Carbury, on the borders of Kildare and Offaly. The area is dominated by the ruins of this great Tudor mansion set atop Carbury Hill, which was also known as Fairy Hill. The motte on the hill was probably built by Meiler FitzHenry who was granted the area by Strongbow. It was acquired by the de Berminghams in the 14th century, before being taken by the native Irish in the 15th century. In 1588 it was granted to the Colley family, ancestors of the Dukes of Wellington, who built a large stronghouse in the 17th century.

Carrick Castle, County Kildare 

Located about 3 miles from Edenderry town, Carrick Castle is a tall square tower which in its original condition would have been 90 feet long and 32 feet in length. This was the castle built by Sir Pierce Bermingham in the 13th century and is the site of the O'Connor massacre.
The view from Carrick is very impressive and its elevation, as with Carbury would have been used as a strong means of defence. Unfortunately it is in very poor condition with only two main walls remaining. However, some of the detail is still visible as in the window and chimney detail.
To the left of Carrick is an abandoned church and graveyard.

Grange Castle, County Kildare 

Grange is situated a mile or so from Carrick Castle and is a late 15th-century (1460) tower house built by the Bermingham family. The tower was embellished with ornate Jacobean chimneys and battlements in the early 17th century. In 1735 Walter Bermingham sold Grange to Thomas Tyrrell in whose family it remained until in 1988. The late Robert Tyrrell transferred ownership of the tower to Dúchas, the then Office of Public Works. The remaining buildings and grounds were handed down to Hugh Tyrrell who lives in England and from whom they are leased by The Tyrrell Trust Ltd.
From 1460 onwards successive generations have added to or changed the character of Grange, with the building of a great hall now fully restored and named as Fallon Hall, with a walled garden, a cow byre and various stables and courtyards which have yet to be restored. Although the grounds are now overgrown, Grange's architecture is a beautiful example of its era.

Dunfierth Church, County Kildare 

The old parochial Church of Dunfierth is located about 2 miles from Johnstown Bridge, Kildare. The ruins are surrounded by an extensive burial-ground with a separate entrance which holds the mortuary chapel of the Bermingham family.

A handsomely sculptured alter-tomb formerly occupied the centre of this chapel, which is now found built into the walls of the vault that surrounds the Bermingham tomb, erected in 1815 by a Frederick Hamilton. The effigy on the original tomb is now placed in an upright position within the chapel. It represents a knight in a suit of plate armour, with a crucifix on the breast attached around the neck by a chain. The effigy is more than likely dedicated to Sir William Bermingham.

Kinnefad Castle, County Offaly 

At Kinnefad (Ceann-atha-fada, "the head of the ford,”) just outside Edenderry is another stronghold of the Berminghams dating from the 14th century. The eastern wall is missing allowing a view of the internal structure including a few remaining flag stones from a spiral staircase. The author Wilde in 'The Beauties of the Boyne and its Tributary, the Blackwater' describes Kinnefad as:
“A large square block of building, measuring 47 feet by 39, on the outside, the external walls being quite perfect. It appears, from its few and narrow windows, as well as its general design, to have belonged to an earlier era than the modern part of the Castle of Carbury, when strength influenced the builder more than attention to comfort. Kinnefad Castle stands beside a shallow in the river which the local traditions say was often the scene of fierce conflict. Lord Downshire’s agent at Edenderry has in his possession several weapons of great antiquity, dug up near this place, celts, sword-blades, spear-heads, etc. “

Monasteroris Monastery, County Offaly 

Monasteroris is located on farm-land as are the majority of the Bermingham castles. Very little exists of Monasteroris today and most of the remains are overgrown with ivy. The name of the friary, Monasteroris comes from the Irish version of the name mainistir Mhic Fheorais, the monastery of the son of Feorais. This is the monastery John de Bermingham, Earl of Louth built for the friars of the area in 1325.
The O'Connors, an ancient Gaelic clan of this area used the friary as a fort. The building was severely damaged during a siege by the Lord Lieutenant in 1521, however the friars stayed in the area for another fifty years. They returned to the site around 1645. After the removal of the friars in Cromwellian times, there was little evidence of Franciscan activity in the area until the friars took on parish work in the Rhode-Daingean area in the eighteenth century. Fr. Matthew Walsh, vicar of Daingean, who died in 1794, was the last friar of Monasteroris.

Blundell Castle, County Offaly 

Blundell castle sits atop a hill which overlooks the town of Edenderry and has for its companion a water tower. The castle was built in the 15th century by the De Berminghams. In the 16th century it was held by the Colley family and as a result, Edenderry became known as Coolestown or Colleytown. Sir George Colley defended the castle from attack by the O'Neill forces in 1599 during the Nine Years' War. In May 1691 the army of James II attacked the castle and it has been derelict ever since.

A tunnel entrance can be found in the vicinity of Blundel and Edenderry locals say this tunnel runs between Blundal and Carbury castle, a distance of about five miles.  If the tunnel actually connects both castles it may have been installed by the Berminghams as a means of communication in times of conflict.
During the 19th century Edenderry was governed by a Lord Downshire and it has been said that his wife used this tunnel to meet her lover at Carbury.  It seems however that this affair was discovered by Downshire and consequently he murdered his wife.

Baldungan Church, County Dublin 

About two miles from Lusk are the ruins of Baldongan Church, with impressive views over the surrounding country and sea. This building was probably founded by the Barnewall family late in the thirteenth century from whom it passed by marriage to the De Berminghams. From the De Berminghams it later went to the house of St. Laurence, possibly by the marriage of Lady Elizabeth Bermingham, daughter to Thomas Bermingham, Lord Athenry to Christopher St. Laurance, Earl of Howth.

Athenry Castle and Priory, County Galway 

Athenry Monastery was built by Meiler de Bermingham in 1241. He paid 160 marks (£106.67) and requested other noblemen as well as his own knights and esquires, according to their ranks and means, to give subsidy and aid in the building of a monastery. He also gave gifts of wine, English cloth, and horses for drawing stones. When completed he presented this monastery to the Dominican friars together with another 160 marks so that they could build an abbey. Athenry Castle is also attributed to Meiler de Bermingham and stands on an artificial mound from an earlier period.

It is likely Meiler got a direct grant of lands in Athenry from Richard de Burgh. He was granted a market and fair in Athenry by King Henry III in 1244:
"The King to all, &c. as above.  Know ye that We have granted, and by this our Charter confirmed, to Meyler de Burmingeham that he and his Heirs for ever may have One Market in every Week at their Manor of Adneri on Thursday, and One Fair there in Year to last for Eights Days, &c. as above; unless that Market and that Fair be to the Detriment of the neighbouring Markets and Fairs.  Wherefore We will, &c. Witnesses and given as above."

Dunmore Castle, County Galway 

Dunmore – from the Irish an Dún Mór, meaning the big fort. Dunmore Castle is a fortified tower which was built by the Meiler de Bermingham  in about 1225. It was burned by the Irish in 1249, 1284 and 1315. In the early 14th century it was raised by a second storey and in the 16th century a gabled roof, fireplaces and chimneys were added.
The De Bermingham family held the castle until Cromwellian times and it was inhabited up until the 19th century.

References 
 Bermingham: Origins and History of the Family Name – 1060 to 1830, Douglas P. Bermingham, 2012. 
 Manual of origin, descent, etc., of Barony of Athenry, Dublin, 1820.
 Carbury and the Birminghams's county Matthew Devitt, Journal of the Kildare Archaeological and Historical Society, (1896–99)
 Notes on the Bermingham Pedigree G. H. Orpen, op. cit., IX (1915–16), pp. 195–205.
 The Bermingham family of Athenry Hubert T. Knox, op.cit., X, (1917–1918), pp. 139–54.
 The Surnames of Ireland, Edward MacLysaght, p. 17, Dublin, 1978.

External links 
 https://www.amazon.co.uk/Bermingham-Origins-History-Family-Name/dp/1461121701/ref=sr_1_1?s=books&ie=UTF8&qid=1340225748&sr=1-1#reader_1461121701
 Bermingham (surname)
 https://web.archive.org/web/20110726013809/http://www.edenderryhistory.org/
 Family name: Bermingham/Birmingham (Lord Athenry) National University of Ireland, Galway
 Bermingham/Birmingham House National University of Ireland, Galway
 Bermingham family, Barons Athenry The National Archives

Castles in Ireland